This article shows all participating team squads at the 2003 FIVB Volleyball Men's World Cup, held from November 16 to November 29, 2003 in several cities in Japan.

Head Coach: Bernardo Rezende

Head Coach: Stelio DeRocco

Head Coach: Di Anhe

Head Coach: Veselin Vuković

Head Coach: Philippe Blain

Head Coach: Gian Paolo Montali

Head Coach: Mikiyasu Tanaka

Head Coach: Ljubomir Travica

Head Coach: Cha Joo-Hyun

Head Coach: Antonio Giacobbe

Head Coach: Doug Beal

Head Coach: Miguel Cambero

References
FIVB

F
S